The Federation of Africa University Sports (FASU) is the governing body responsible for sporting activities in African universities.

History 
The origin of the body can be traced to 1971 when thirty one (31) delegates from seventeen (17) universities in 10 African countries gathered in Lagos with the aim of unifying and improving sporting activities in African universities.

This gathering was a result of the directive given to Lateef Adegbite from Nigeria at the Summer FISU games in Torino, Italy in 1970 by the West African University Games (WAUG) Council to meet all the African delegations and harmonize sporting activities in Africa.

After this meeting, George Benneh from the University of Ghana emerged as the first president of the body while E.T. Kodzi from Ghana emerged as the secretary general.

Executive Committee 
This is the committee responsible for decision making of the body. The committee is made up of the members elected by the assembly, presidents of the zones and immediate past president.

This committee meets at least four times every year. Members of the committee includes;
 Nomsa Mahlangu -  President
 Daouda Sidibe - 1st Vice President
 Life Chemhere - 2nd Vice President
 Peninnah Aligawesa Kabenge - Secretary General
 Abbay Kidane Belayhun - Treasurer
 Malumbete M. Ralethe - Immediate Past President
 Raveloson N. Mamitiana - Internal Auditor
 Mandla Tshabalala - Legal and Disciplinary Committee
 Simon Munayi - President Federation of East Africa University Sports (FEAUS)
 Ibrahim Tanko Shaibu - President WAUG Interim (West African University Games)
 Mwape Nshimbi - President Confederation of Universities and Colleges Sports Association (CUCSA)
 Joseph Nzau wa Nzau - President FASU Central

Activities and events of FASU 
Activities of FASU is binding on every member nations under the body. Some of these activities includes;
 FASU games every two years
 FASU championships every two years
 FASU Pre-Games Scientific conference before the FASU Games

References 

Sports governing bodies in Africa
Sports organizations established in 1971
1971 establishments in Africa